Joseph Burke was a professional baseball right fielder in the Negro leagues. He played with the Indianapolis Athletics and St. Louis Stars in 1937. He is also listed as Charles Burke in some sources.

References

External links
 and Seamheads

Indianapolis Athletics players
St. Louis Stars (1937) players
Year of birth missing
Year of death missing
Baseball outfielders